Mudryk is a Ukrainian surname. Notable people with this surname include:
 Bryan Mudryk (born 1979), Canadian sportscaster
 Mykhailo Mudryk (born 2001), Ukrainian footballer
 Vladyslav Mudryk (born 2001), Ukrainian footballer

See also
 
 Mudrik, a cognate surname

Ukrainian-language surnames